The 2011–12 Illinois State Redbirds men's basketball team represented Illinois State University during the 2011–12 NCAA Division I men's basketball season. The Redbirds, led by fifth year head coach Tim Jankovich, played their home games at Doug Collins Court at Redbird Arena and were a member of the Missouri Valley Conference.

The Redbirds finished the season 21–14, 9–9 in conference play to finish in a five-way tie for third place. They were the number four seed for the Missouri Valley Conference tournament. They won their quarterfinal game versus the University of Northern Iowa and their semifinal game versus Wichita State University but lost their final game versus Creighton University.

The Redbirds received an at-large bid to the 2012 National Invitation Tournament and were assigned the number seven seed in the University of Arizona regional. They were victorious over the University of Mississippi in the first round but were defeated by Stanford University in the second round.

Roster

Schedule

|-
!colspan=9 style=|Exhibition Season

|-
!colspan=9 style=|Regular Season

|-
!colspan=9 style=|State FarmMissouri Valley Conference {MVC} Tournament

|-
!colspan=9 style=|National Invitation {NIT} Tournament

References

Illinois State Redbirds men's basketball seasons
Illinois State
Illinois State